Elżbieta Magdalena Wąsik (born 25 April 1961 in Kielce, Poland) is a Polish linguist specializing in general linguistics and semiotics of communication, employed as professor extraordinarius at Adam Mickiewicz University in Poznań, Poland.

Educational career
She has got her basic education in the domain of German and Dutch general linguistics (1981–1986), along with the PhD in general linguistics (1995) from the University of Wrocław. Subsequently, she completed her habilitation at the Adam Mickiewicz University in Poznań in 2008 and received her D.Litt. degree.

Professional experience 
Having received her vocational MA degree in German with a specialization in Dutch on June 27, 1986, in the Institute of German Language and Literature at the Faculty of Languages and Literatures of the University of Wrocław, she starting working in the Department of General Linguistics, University of Wrocław, as a Trainee-Assistant from November 15, 1986.

Subsequently, from November 15, 1987 she became Assistant, and from October 1, 1989 Senior Assistant.

She opened the procedure for her dissertation submission on June 22, 1993. She defended her doctoral dissertation Ecology of Minority Languages on the Example of Frisian (Ekologia języków mniejszościowych na przykładzie języka fryzyjskiego), written under the supervision of Prof. Dr. habil. Antoni Furdal, on November 23, 1995, at the Faculty of Languages and Literature of the University of Wrocław.

On February 15, 1996, she was promoted to the position of assistant professor.

With the beginning of the academic year 1999/2000, as a result of organizational changes in the faculty, she found herself in the Division of General and Comparative Linguistics of the Institute of German, University of Wrocław.

Since October 1, 2000, she has worked at the position of assistant professor in the School of English of the Adam Mickiewicz University, teaching on the ecology of Germanic languages and Frisian, at first in the Research Center for Dutch and Afrikaans, later on in the Department of Linguistic Semiotics, and at present in the Department of Old Germanic Languages, AMU.

She obtained her D.Litt. of humanistic sciences degree in general linguistics after the habilitation colloquium on July 7, 2008, in the School of English of the AMU in Poznań, on the basis of the habilitation dissertation Language – A Tool or a Property of Man? Towards an Idea of Ecological Grammar of Human Linkages (Język – narzędzie czy właściwość człowieka? Założenia gramatyki ekologicznej lingwistycznych związków międzyludzkich).

She is contracted as professor extraordinarius at AMU from September 1, 2011, until August 31, 2017.

She took part in the 13th and 14th Seminar on Language, Literature and Culture of Albania (August 15–30, 1987 and August 15–30, 1988 respectively) organized by the University of Pristina in Kosovo, then Yugoslavia.

She completed her scientific-research assistantship in the Frisian Institute of the University of Groningen granted by Ministry of Education of the Kingdom of the Netherlands (February 1-June 30, 1990).

Teaching duties 
She has taught the following courses at the University of Wrocław: 
 Knowledge of Language for Cultural Studies students; 
 Rhetoric, Eristic and Culture of Language for Political Science students; 
 Practical Knowledge of German – coursebook, listening comprehension, conversation and translation, speaking for German Studies students; 
 General Linguistics;
 Descriptive Grammar of German – morphology and phonetics as well as Frisian studies for Dutch specialization students, syntax and phonetics for German Studies students; 
 Semiotics and Social Communication Studies for Ethnology students;
 Introduction to Linguistics.

Courses taught at Adam Mickiewicz University before habilitation: 
 Knowledge of German Speaking Countries for translatological specialization; 
 Introduction to Frisian Studies;
 Grammar of Old Frisian;
 Ecology of West-Germanic Languages;
 Old-High German Grammar;
 Frisian in Historical-Comparative Perspective;
 subject seminar on human-centered linguistics; 
 monographic lecture Language and Man in the History of Linguistic Thought for English Studies students.

Courses taught in the last years after habilitation – in the AMU School of English, now Faculty of English: 
 MA seminar on the self in transactional communication on the basis of literary and journalistic discourse;
 PhD seminar on the issues of linguistic self in communicative interactions;
 monographic lectures on the history of linguistic thought (part 3, from the 1950s to contemporary times) for students of doctoral studies in the AMU School of English, now Faculty of English.

Scientific achievements
Professor Elżbieta Wąsik has published 3 books:
 The Ecology of Frisian. From the Studies on the Situation of Ethnolinguistic Minorities in Europe (Ekologia języka fryzyjskiego. Z badań nad sytuacją mniejszości etnolingwistycznych w Europie), Wrocław 1999;
 Language – A Tool or Property of Man? Towards an Idea of Ecological Grammar of Human Linkages (Język - narzędzie czy właściwość człowieka? Założenia gramatyki ekologicznej lingwistycznych związków międzyludzkich), Poznań 2007;
 Coping with an Idea of Ecological Grammar, Frankfurt am Main et al. 2010.

She wrote 35 articles (including 3 communiqués and 2 reviews) as well as 31 abstracts in conference or congress materials and reports belonging to the domain of general and Germanic linguistics, Dutch and Frisian studies, philosophy of language and the methodology of linguistics, inter alia, on:
 the conditionings of minority languages, 
 linguistic functionalism and the principle of abstractive relevance in then metaurbanist discourse on art and architecture, 
 the ecological grammar of human linkage,
 the ecological-semiotic existence mode of language in global and local contexts, 
 the transcendental self in search of the absolute, 
 the existential aspects of the individual, social and transcendental self in neosemiotics studies, 
 speech as a semiotic extension of the self.

Her contribution to science has been noticeable in the following domains: 
 the typology of proverbs originated from Latin in German, Dutch and Polish;
 studies on the description of external conditionings of minority languages; 
 working out a model of an ecological description of languages on the basis of Frisian;
 a proposal of an ecological grammar of interpersonal and intersubjective linkages on the basis of observational and assumable properties of individuals who mutually communicate, while sending and receiving verbal means and understanding and interpreting them in a similar way;
 explorations in the domain of human-centered linguistics and semiotics concentrated on the typology of the existence modes of the self in communicative Interactions.

She has marked her presence on international conferences and congresses in Poland, Federal Republic of Germany, Czech Republic, Slovakia, Slovenia, Belgium, Finland, Latvia and the United States. She has delivered 42 papers (including 35 on international meetings, 4 on national and 3 on local ones).

Academic schooling 
She is the supervisor of two doctoral dissertations. She has reviewed one doctoral dissertation. She has prepared one editorial review of a scientific article. She performs the duty of a scientific supervision of one doctoral student fulfilling the condition for opening the dissertation procedure.

Professional memberships 
Between 1987 and 2000 she was an associate worker of the Language Commission of the Wrocław Scientific Society.

Since 1989 she has been a member of the Polish Society of Linguistics, and since 1998 a member of Societas Linguistica Europaea.

On April 1, 2010 she was nominated a Scholar of the International Communicology Institute in Washington, D.C., on the recommendation of the Director and the Collegium of Fellows.

Since September 2011 she has been a Full Member of the Semiotic Society of America.

On May 21, 2012 she received a nomination (with Diploma and Medal) for Fellow of the International Communicology Institute in Washington, D.C., from the hands of Professor Richard L. Lanigan on the recommendation of the ICI Director of the Collegium of Fellows.

Organizational achievements 
In the field of cooperation with scientific partners abroad, she organized two scientific workshops within the framework of Poznań Linguistic Meetings (PLM):

 The first one, co-organized with Oebele Vries from the University of Groningen, was held in Gniezno in 2009 and exposed the issues of the heritage of Frisian identity in language and culture. Thanks to contacts established at that time, she invited Professor Arjena Versloot from the Frisian Academy and the University of Amsterdam to conduct two sessions on Frisian in the academic year 2009/2010 and 2010/12.
 Then, along with Professor Dr. Richard L. Lanigan, Director of ICI, she organized the Semiotic Self in Communicative Interactions workshop within the PLM on May 1–3, 2011.

In the following year, cooperating with Józef Zaprucki, PhD from the Karkonosze Higher State School in Jelenia Góra, she organized the symposium Semiotics of Belonging: Existential, Axiological and Praxeological Aspects of Self-Identity at Home and Abroad within the framework of the 27th International Summer School for Semiotic and Structural Studies, held in Imatra, Finland on June 8–12, 2012.

In 2013 she presented the results of her investigations into the linguistic self in communicative interactions at the international 6th ICI Summer Conference and First Annual Duquesne Conference, organized by Duquesne University in Pittsburgh, Pennsylvania, on July 9–13, 2013.

Honorary distinctions
In 2008 she received an Individual Award of the 2nd Degree for the achievements in scientific work granted by the Rector of Adam Mickiewicz University.

Biographical listings 
Her name was the subject of a biographical entry in the Golden Book of Humanistic Sciences (Złota Księga Nauk Humanistycznych) (Gliwice: Helion, 2012).

In 2013, she received an external nomination to present her Curriculum Vitae in the Marquis Who's Who in the World (A Who's Who in America publication of Reed Elsevier) encyclopedia.

She was nominated a Member of the „Leading Educators of the World 2013” by the International Biographical Center in Ely, Cambridgeshire.

References
 Adam Mickiewicz University profile
 Polish Science Database entry
 International Communicology Institute Fellows and Scholars list
 WorldCat Identities entry

1961 births
Living people
Linguists from Poland
Women linguists
Academic staff of Adam Mickiewicz University in Poznań
Polish women academics